The South Africa national cricket team visited India in 2000 for a two-match Test series and a five-match ODI series. The Test teams were led by Hansie Cronje and Sachin Tendulkar respectively for South Africa and India, while the latter's ODI side was led by Sourav Ganguly. South Africa won the Test series 2–0, while India took the ODI series by a 3–2 margin. The ODI series was later marred by a dramatic match fixing scandal. It was the first time that a visiting Test team had won in India for thirteen years, and the last Test matches to be played by Cronje.

Squads

Tour match

Test series

1st Test

2nd Test

ODI series

1st ODI

2nd ODI

3rd ODI

4th ODI

5th ODI

See also
 South Africa cricket match fixing

References

External links 
 Tour home at ESPNcricinfo

2000 in Indian cricket
2000 in South African cricket
1999-2000
International cricket competitions from 1997–98 to 2000
Indian cricket seasons from 1970–71 to 1999–2000